John P. Hoffmann (born May 2, 1962) is a professor of Sociology and Associate Dean in the College of Family, Home, and Social Sciences at Brigham Young University, where he joined the faculty in 1999.

Education and research
He completed his undergraduate studies at James Madison University in his native Virginia, where he majored in Political Science. He went on receive an MPH from the Rollins School of Public Health at Emory University and a PhD in Criminal Justice from University at Albany, SUNY.  According to his faculty biography at Brigham Young, his research focuses on "the etiology and consequences of drug use, theories of delinquency, mental health problems, and the influence of religious affiliation and practices on behaviors and attitudes."

Books
He is the author of Japanese Saints: Mormons in the Land of the Rising Sun, published by Lexington Books in 2007, and Delinquency Theories: Appraisals and Applications, published by Routledge in 2011.

References 

1962 births
Living people
American sociologists
Rollins School of Public Health alumni
James Madison University alumni
University at Albany, SUNY alumni